Stan Livingstone (16 September 1913 – 13 October 1992) was  a former Australian rules footballer who played with Footscray in the Victorian Football League (VFL).

Notes

External links 
		

1913 births
1992 deaths
Australian rules footballers from New South Wales
Western Bulldogs players